Nigar Malikova (born 10 July 1983) is an Azerbaijani former footballer who played as a midfielder. She has been a member of the Azerbaijan women's national team.

References

1983 births
Living people
Women's association football midfielders
Azerbaijani women's footballers
Azerbaijan women's international footballers